The West Bengal Film Journalists' Association Award for Best Male Playback Singer is given yearly by WBFJA as a part of its annual West Bengal Film Journalists' Association Awards for Bengali films, to recognize the best male singer of the previous year.

Superlatives

List of winners
 2017 Nachiketa Chakraborty – "Ek Purono Mosjide" from Zulfiqar
 Arijit Singh – "Tomake Chai" from Gangster
 Anupam Roy – "Kolkata" from Praktan
 Jeet Gannguli – "Aaj Amay" from Power
 Vicky A Khan – "Awaara Dil" from Ki Kore Toke Bolbo
 2018 Arijit Singh – "Maula Re" from Chaamp
 Arijit Singh – "Dugga Ma" from Bolo Dugga Maiki
 Anupam Roy – "Ahare Mon" from Projapoti Biskut
 Nachiketa Chakraborty – "Keno Erokom Kichu Holo Na" from Posto
 Neel Dutt – "E Sohor" from The Bongs Again
 2019 Anupam Roy – "Aamar Dukkho Gulo" from Drishtikone
 Rupam Islam – "Girlfriend Title Track" from Girlfriend
 Shreyan Bhattacharya – "Bhutu Bhaijaan" from Haami
 Rupankar Bagchi – "Jaago Jaago Uma" from Uma
 Sudipto Chowdhury – "Tor Sathe" from Generation Ami
 Raj Barman – "Sudhu Tui" from Villain
 Anindya Bose – "Ki Debo Bol Toke" from Kaya
 Arnab Dutta – "Tapur Tupur" from Rosogolla
 2020 Anirban Bhattacharya – "Kicchu Chaini Aami" from Shah Jahan Regency
 Neel Dutt – "Chhiley Bondhu" from Finally Bhalobasha
 Anupam Roy – "Alote Alote Dhaka" from Konttho
 Papon – "Hazar Bochor" from Tritiya Adhyay
 Raj Barman – "Keno Je Toke Pahara" from Mon Jane Na
 Timir Biswas – "Amar Bhul Hoye Geche Priyo" from Rajlokhi O Srikanto
 2021 Ishan Mitra - "Raat Pohale" from Dracula Sir
 Mohammed Irfan - "Tor hoye jete chai" from Asur
 Arijit Singh - "Abar Phire Ele" from Dwitiyo Purush
 Dev Arijit - "Shune Ne" from Love Aaj Kal Porshu
 Ishan Mitra - "Shono Ami Abar Jonmo Nebo" from Dracula Sir
 2022 Anindya Chatterjee - "Tomar E Toh Kachhe" from Prem Tame and Shovon Ganguly - "Rasher Gaan" from Golondaaj
 Mahtim Shakib - "Takey Olpo Kache Dakchhi" from Prem Tame
 Surojeet Mukherjee - "Baburam Shapure" from Tangra Blues
 Ishan Mitra - "Mayar Kangal" from Olpo Holeo Sotti
 Anindya Chatterjee - "Tonic - Title Track" from Tonic
 2023 Arijit Singh - "Bhalobashar Morshum" from X=Prem and Saptak Sanai Das - "Cindrella Mon" from X=Prem
 Arijit Singh - "Oboseshe" from Kishmish
 Anupam Roy - "Sohage Adore" from Belashuru
 Papon - "Kanna" from Kishmish
 Sonu Nigam - "Mukti" from Kacher Manush

See also
 West Bengal Film Journalists' Association Awards
 Cinema of India

References

Indian music awards
Year of establishment missing
West Bengal awards